The Oklahoma Hall of Fame was founded in 1927 by Anna B. Korn to officially celebrate Statehood Day, recognize Oklahomans dedicated to their communities, and provide educational programming for all ages. The first Oklahoma Hall of Fame Induction Ceremony was held the next year, inducting the first two members into the hall of fame. In the 1970s, the Hefner Mansion was donated to the association to house the exhibits and busts or portraits of the inductees, and the organization changed its name to the Oklahoma Heritage Association in 1971. It then moved into the former Mid-Continent Life Insurance building in Oklahoma City in 2007 and opened the Gaylord-Pickens Museum with interactive exhibits. In 2015, the organization changed its name for the final time to the Oklahoma Hall of Fame, in order to better represent the goals and mission of the organization.  

To be eligible for induction, an individual must satisfy the following criteria:

 Reside in Oklahoma or be a former resident of the state.
 Have performed outstanding service to humanity, the State of Oklahoma and the United States.
 Be known for their public service throughout the state.

In 2000, the rules were changed to allow for posthumous nominations.

Portraits of the inductees can be seen at the Gaylord-Pickens Museum in Oklahoma City. As of 2020, 714 members have been inducted since 1928, with more inducted annually.

Notable inductees
Jack Abernathy, United States Marshal
Carl Albert, member of U. S. House of Representatives from Oklahoma (1947–1977); Speaker of the House (1971–1977)
Bill Anoatubby, Chickasaw Nation governor
C.R. Anthony, businessman 
Hannah Atkins, Oklahoma State Representative
Gene Autry, singer and actor inducted as an entrepreneur
Dewey F. Bartlett, Governor of Oklahoma (1967–1971)
Page Belcher, politician 
Henry Bellmon, politician 
Johnny Bench, baseball player
Clay Bennett, businessman
Henry G. Bennett, educator 
George S. Benson, missionary
James E. Berry, politician 
William Bizzell, educator
G. T. Blankenship, Oklahoma State Representative
David L. Boren, Oklahoma Governor
Lyle Boren, politician 
David Ross Boyd, educator
Bill Bright, evangelist 
Anita Bryant, Miss Oklahoma
Admiral Joseph Clark. World War II admiral
Woodrow Wilson (Woody) Crumbo. Native American artist
F. Hiner Dale, judge
Angie Debo, author
Kevin Durant, NBA player
Rachel Caroline Eaton, believed to be the first Oklahoma Native American woman to get her Ph.D.
Gary England, meteorologist
General Tommy Franks, Iraq War general
John Hope Franklin, historian 
Gray Frederickson, Academy Award- and Emmy-winning producer 
Rev. Gregory Gerrer, OSB, artist, museum founder  
Vince Gill, singer
Sylvan Goldman, inventor of the shopping cart
Thomas Gore, first U.S. senator from Oklahoma (1907–1921)  
Woody Guthrie, singer, songwriter and musician
Harold Hamm, CEO of the oil company Continental Resources
Paul Harvey, radio commentator
Lillian Gallup Haskell, inaugural First Lady of the state
Henry Iba, basketball coach
William S. Key, decorated veteran of both World Wars; Major general in the Oklahoma National Guard and Warden of Oklahoma State Penitentiary
Patience Latting, first woman to serve as Mayor of Oklahoma City and any U.S. city with more than 350,000 people; inducted in 1980.
Eugene Lorton, longtime editor and publisher of the Tulsa World 
Tom Love, owner, founder, and chairman of Love's Travel Stops & Country Stores
Wilma Mankiller, Principal Chief of the Cherokee Nation (1985–1995)
Mickey Mantle, baseball player 
Reba McEntire, singer
Clem McSpadden, politician and rodeo announcer
Augusta Metcalfe, artist
 James C. Nance, Oklahoma community newspaper chain publisher and former Speaker of the Oklahoma House of Representatives, President pro tempore of the Oklahoma Senate and member Uniform Law Commission
Jens Rud Nielsen, physicist 
Robert L. Owen, U. S. Senator from Oklahoma 
Patti Page, singer
Frank Phillips, oilman and philanthropist  
Waite Phillips, businessman and philanthropist
T. Boone Pickens, oilman and entrepreneur
Will Rogers, humorist
Charles Schusterman, businessman and philanthropist.
Nan Sheets, painter and museum director
Blake Shelton, singer
Warren Spahn, baseball player
Barry Switzer, college football coach
Steven W. Taylor, Oklahoma Supreme Court Justice
Joseph B. Thoburn, scholar of Oklahoma history
Elmer Thomas, U. S. Congressman  and Senator from Oklahoma
Jim Thorpe, athlete
Sharen Jester Turney, American Businesswoman
Carrie Underwood, singer
Elizabeth Warren, U.S. Senator  from Massachusetts
Russell Westbrook, NBA player
Alma Wilson, first woman Oklahoma Supreme Court justice and chief justice
 Alfre Woodard, actor

References

External links
 

Halls of fame in Oklahoma
Oklahoma A
Awards established in 1927
1927 establishments in Oklahoma